Matungao, officially the Municipality of Matungao (Maranao: Inged a Matungao;), is a 5th class municipality in the province of Lanao del Norte, Philippines. According to the 2020 census, it has a population of 14,756 people.

The word Matungao literally means cold in Maranao language. This municipality is a bastion of peace between Muslims and Christians and an ardent advocate of the Maranao culture. Matungao stages annually the well-loved Maranao courtship dance in the colorful and gliterry Kapagtota Festival.

History
Executive Order No. 230, s. 1949, signed on June 20, 1949: "...the barrios of Nunang, Matungao, Matampai, Pasayanon, Pangi, Somiorang, Batangan, Bangco, and Batal, all of the municipal district of Pantao-Ragat, Province of Lanao, are hereby organized into an independent municipal district under the name of Matungao with the seat of government at the barrio of Matungao."

Geography

Barangays
Matungao is politically subdivided into 12 barangays.
 Bubong Radapan
 Bangco
 Batal
 Batangan
 Cadayonan
 Matampay
 Pangi
 Pasayanon
 Poblacion (Matungao)
 Puntod
 Santa Cruz
 Somiorang

Climate

Demographics

Economy

Government
Mayors after People Power Revolution 1986:

References

External links
 Matungao Profile at the DTI Cities and Municipalities Competitive Index
 [ Philippine Standard Geographic Code]
Philippine Census Information
Local Governance Performance Management System

Municipalities of Lanao del Norte
Establishments by Philippine executive order